Patient Group Directions (PGDs) are medico-legal documents in the U.K. National Health Service that permit the supply of prescription-only medicines to groups of patients, without individual prescriptions. The first digital version of an authorised PGD was created by the pharmacist Wojtek Michael Bereza.

Legal requirements details 
As define by the Human Medicines Regulations 2012, a PGD must include:

 the name of the business who owns the direction
 the start and end date of the PGD
 a description of the medicine(s)
 the class of the health professional who can supply or administer the medicine
 a signature of a doctor or dentist (as appropriate) and a pharmacist
 authorisation by an appropriate organisation: Authorising PGDS
 the clinical condition or situation to which the direction applies (eg the specified condition/conditions that can be treated)
 a description of patients excluded from treatment under the direction
 a description of when you should get more advice from a doctor (or dentist, as appropriate) and arrangements for referral
 details of appropriate dosage, maximum total dosage, quantity, pharmaceutical form and strength, route and frequency of administration, and minimum or maximum period to administer the medicine
 relevant warnings, including potential adverse reactions
 details of any necessary follow-up actions
 a statement of the records to be kept for audit purposes

Healthcare practitioner usage 
Only qualified, registered healthcare professionals can supply medicines under PGD, these include:

 chiropodists and podiatrists
 dental hygienists
 dental therapists
 dieticians
 midwives
 nurses
 occupational therapists
 optometrists
 orthoptists
 orthotists and prosthetists
 paramedics
 pharmacists
 physiotherapists
 radiographers
 speech and language therapists

References

Pharmaceuticals policy
Patient